Q17 may refer to:
 Q17 (New York City bus)
 Al-Isra', the seventeenth surah of the Quran
 Boonville Airport (California)
 , a Naïade-class submarine